Michael Robert Tauchman (born December 3, 1990) is an American professional baseball outfielder in the Chicago Cubs organization. He has played in Major League Baseball (MLB) for the Colorado Rockies, New York Yankees, and San Francisco Giants, and in the KBO League for the Hanwha Eagles. In his senior year of college in 2013 at Bradley University he batted .425, leading all NCAA Division I baseball players. The Rockies selected Tauchman in the 10th round of the 2013 MLB draft. He made his MLB debut in 2017.

Early life
Tauchman attended William Fremd High School in Palatine, Illinois, where he played baseball, and was also the quarterback and safety for the football team. In baseball, he batted .490 and was named Mid-Suburban League West Player of the Year as a senior. In football, he led a second-half comeback against future NFL quarterback Jimmy Garoppolo in a game during his senior year. 

He attended Bradley University, majored in business management & administration, and played college baseball for the Bradley Braves. In 2013, his senior year, Tauchman batted .425 (leading all NCAA Division I)/.513 (leading the Missouri Valley Conference)/.591(1st) with 52 runs (2nd), 15 doubles (6th), 5 triples (3rd), 2 home runs, 41 RBIs (8th), 10 HBP (4th), and 28 stolen bases (2nd) in 30 attempts. He won the 2013 MVC Baseball Player of the Year Award, was a Rawlings/American Baseball Coaches Association First Team All-American, First Team All-MVC, and named to the MVC All-Defensive Team.

Professional career

Colorado Rockies

The Colorado Rockies selected Tauchman in the 10th round of the 2013 MLB draft. In 2013 he played for the Short-Season Tri-City Dust Devils and batted .297/.388/.377 with 38 runs (5th in the league), 3 triples (4th), 33 walks (7th), and 20 stolen bases (3rd) in 236 at bats, and was named a Northwest League Mid-Season All-Star. In 2014 he played for Tri-City and then for the High-A California League Modesto Nuts, batting a combined .293/.384/.437 with 4 home runs, 22 RBIs and 15 stolen bases in 222 at bats. 

In 2015 Tauchman played for the Double-A New Britain Rock Cats, batted .294 (4th in the league)/.355/.381 with 62 runs (10th), 6 triples (3rd), 3 home runs, 43 RBIs, 47 walks (7th), and 25 stolen bases (5th) in 507 at bats, and was named an Eastern League Post-Season All-Star. In 2016 he played for the Triple-A Albuquerque Isotopes, batting .286/.342/.373 with one home run, 51 RBIs, 6 sacrifice hits (6th in the league), and 23 stolen bases (2nd) in 475 at bats. He then played for Águilas del Zulia in the Venezuelan Winter League, batting .269/.343/.328 with one home run, nine RBIs, and five stolen bases (10th in the league) in 119 at bats over 31 games.

In 2017 he played for the AAA Albuquerque Isotopes and batted .331 (3rd in the league)/.386/.555, with 8 triples (9th), 16 home runs, 80 RBIs (8th), 3 intentional walks, and 10 sacrifice flies (1st) in 420 at bats, and was named a Pacific Coast League Post-Season All-Star and an MiLB.com Organization All-Star.

The Rockies called Tauchman up to the majors for the first time on June 27, 2017. He batted 6-for-27 for the Rockies in 2017.

Playing again for Albuquerque, Tauchman was named PCL Player of the Week for May 14–20, 2018, after batting .417 with eight runs, five home runs, eight RBIs, 27 total bases, two multi-homer games, and a slugging percentage of 1.125. For the 2018 season in the PCL, he batted .323/.408/.571(7th in the league) with 20 home runs (6th), 81 RBIs (6th), and 6 sacrifice flies (6th) in 403 at bats, and was named a Mid-Season and Post-Season PCL All-Star and an MiLB.com Organization All-Star. He also played in 21 major league games in 2018, batting 3-for-32.

In his minor league career through 2019, Tauchman played 278 games in center field, 208 games in left field, and 120 games in right field. He batted .303/.375/.453 in 2,358 at bats.

New York Yankees

On March 23, 2019, the Rockies traded Tauchman to the New York Yankees in exchange for pitcher  Phil Diehl. He made the Yankees' Opening Day roster. On September 10 he was placed on the 10-day injured list with a left calf strain.  He batted .277/.361/.504 with 13 home runs, 47 RBIs, and 6 stolen bases without being caught in 260 at bats over 87 games for the Yankees. He saw 4.34 pitches per plate appearance, the highest rate of anyone on the Yankees roster who had at least 200 plate appearances. He was second in the AL in percentage of balls hit to the opposite field, at 35.3%, behind only Luis Arráez. He played all three outfield positions during the season, playing 473 innings in left field, 122 in right field, and 100 in center field. He also batted .274/.386/.505 in 95 at bats for the Triple-A Scranton/Wilkes-Barre RailRiders of the International League.

During the 2020 season for the Yankees, Tauchman batted .242/.342/.305 in 95 at bats with 14 RBIs and 6 stolen bases without being caught, and hampered by a lingering right shoulder injury did not hit any home runs. He began the 2021 season with the Yankees, with whom he had 14 at bats.

San Francisco Giants
On April 27, 2021, the Yankees traded Tauchman to the San Francisco Giants in exchange for pitcher Wandy Peralta and Connor Cannon. On May 28, Tauchman robbed Albert Pujols of a walk-off home run. 11 days later, he hit his first MLB career grand slam to take the lead against the Texas Rangers. Three days after the grand slam, Tauchman robbed Juan Soto of a game-tying home run to keep Anthony DeSclafani's shutout intact. 

On July 29, Tauchman was designated for assignment after hitting .178 with an OPS of .569 in 152 at bats. On August 2, Tauchman cleared waivers and was outrighted to the Triple-A Sacramento River Cats. On October 13, Tauchman elected free agency.

Hanwha Eagles
On December 9, 2021, Tauchman signed a one-year contract for $1 million with the Hanwha Eagles of the KBO League. In 2022, he batted .289/.366/.430 with 12 home runs in 575 at bats. He became a free agent after the year.

Chicago Cubs
On January 13, 2023, Tauchman signed a minor league contract with the Chicago Cubs organization.

Personal life
Tauchman and his wife, Eileen, married in January 2017.

See also
2013 College Baseball All-America Team

References

External links

1990 births
Living people
People from Palatine, Illinois
Baseball players from Illinois
Major League Baseball outfielders
Colorado Rockies players
New York Yankees players
San Francisco Giants players
Bradley Braves baseball players
Tri-City Dust Devils players
Modesto Nuts players
New Britain Rock Cats players
Albuquerque Isotopes players
Scranton/Wilkes-Barre RailRiders players
Águilas del Zulia players
American expatriate baseball players in Venezuela
Alaska Goldpanners of Fairbanks players